Fannia ornata is a  species of fly in the family Fanniidae. This species is smaller and more slender than the house fly, Musca domestica, and is similar in appearance to the lesser house fly, Fannia canicularis.

References

Fanniidae
Insects described in 1826